Werl (Westphalian: Wiärl) is a town located in the district of Soest in North Rhine-Westphalia, Germany.

Geography
Werl is easily accessible because it is located between the Sauerland, Münsterland, and the Ruhr Area. The Hellweg road runs through the city, as Werl is a part of the fertile Bördelandschaft of the Werl–Unnaer Börde.

Neighbouring municipalities

Division of the town 
Werl consists of the following districts:
 Blumenthal (48 inhabitants)
 Budberg (596 inhabitants)
 Büderich (3107 inhabitants) 
 Hilbeck (1339 inhabitants)
 Holtum (1049 inhabitants)
 Mawicke (521 inhabitants)
 Niederbergstraße (210 inhabitants)
 Oberbergstraße (363 inhabitants)
 Sönnern (870 inhabitants)
 Westönnen (2665 inhabitants)
 Werl (22151 inhabitants)

History
Werl was a member of the Hanseatic League in the Middle Ages and since 1661 has had a statue of the Virgin Mary, making it a place of pilgrimage. Today this relic is in the Wallfahrtsbasilika and is looked after by the Franciscan religious order. Werl Prison is the third largest in North Rhine-Westphalia, Werl Prison.
 The 4th United States Army Field Artillery Detachment was stationed in Werl until 1992.

Mayors
 1958–1965: Ferdinand Pöppinghaus (1923–1965) (CDU)
 1965–1981: Amalie Rohrer (1922-2014) (CDU)
 1981–1985: Heinz Sasse (CDU)
 1986–1994: Elisabeth Böhmer (CDU)
 1994–1996: Kunibert Becker (1934-2001) (CDU)
 1996–1999: Friedrich Leopold Graf von Brühl, (born 1944) (CDU)
 1999–2020: Michael Grossmann, (born 1948) (CDU)
 since 2020: Torben Höbrink (CDU)

Notable people
Philipp Rosenthal (1855–1937), businessman and founder of Rosenthal AG at Schloss Erkersreuth in Selb
Franz von Papen (1879–1969), Conservative politician, diplomat, nobleman and General Staff officer; served as Chancellor of Germany in 1932 and as Vice-Chancellor under Adolf Hitler from 1933–1934
Ulla Wiesner (born 1940), singer
Theodor Redder (born 1941), footballer
Dimitri Hegemann (born 1954), cultural manager, musician and founder of the club "Tresor" in Berlin
Martin Kree (born 1965), footballer
Uwe Grauer (born 1970), footballer and coach

Twin towns – sister cities

Werl is twinned with:
 Halle, Belgium (1973)

References

External links
  
 Images from Werl 

Towns in North Rhine-Westphalia
Members of the Hanseatic League
Soest (district)